H2 USA is a hybrid organization governed by a partnership affiliated with the United States private sector economy and the public sector services. The alliance is supportive of a hydrogen economy and hydrogen technologies with a representation by more than thirty cooperatives considering associations, automakers, energy companies, fuel cell suppliers, materials and component manufacturers, national laboratories, non-governmental organizations, and the United States Department of Energy.

Mission and Motto Statement

Hydrogen Governance in United States
Spark M. Matsunaga Hydrogen Research, Development, and Demonstration Act of 1990
Energy Policy Act of 1992
United States hydrogen policy

See also
Fossil fuel phase-out
Renewable energy commercialization
Renewable energy in the United States
Renewable energy transition
United States energy independence

References

External links
 
 
 
 

Public–private partnership projects in the United States